.hk is the designated Internet country code top-level domain (ccTLD) for Hong Kong. It is administered by the Hong Kong Internet Registration Corporation (HKIRC), the only organization endorsed by the Hong Kong Government to undertake the administration of 'hk' domain names.  Hong Kong Internet Registration Corporation (HKIRC) is a non-profit making, non-statutory, member-based corporation established in 2001.

History 

From its inception in 1990 until 2002, the domain was administered by the Joint University Computer Centre. In 2002, through a "Memorandum of Understanding" with the Hong Kong government, HKIRC took over the administration of '.hk', while the Hong Kong Domain Name Registration Corporation Limited (HKDNR), its wholly owned subsidiary of HKIRC, is responsible for the day-to-day management of the registration service  for Specific '.hk' Domain Names and Generic '.hk' Domain Name (e.g., www.myname.hk). '.hk' domain names can be registered at both the second and third level.

On June 25, 2010, ICANN approved the use of the internationalized country code top-level domain .香港 (hongkong in simplified Chinese characters and traditional Chinese characters;) by HKIRC. This TLD was added to the DNS in July 2010. The Pre Launch Priority Registration for .香港 was started on February 22, 2011. The first .香港 domain was activated on March 23, 2011. 香港 domain categories were opened for public registration since May 31, 2011.

Usage outside Hong Kong 

Some Russian 2ch style imageboards use .hk webnames, such as iichan.hk and 2ch.hk.

Domain categories 
A Chinese domain name must contain at least one Chinese character but can contain English letters as long as there is at least 1 Chinese character  while English domain names must not contain any Chinese characters. All domain names could contain alphanumeric characters and hyphens.

Accredited registrars
As of July 1, 2018.

Local registrars 

 HKDNR (wholly owned subsidiary of HKIRC)
UDomain Web Hosting Company Limited
 Eranet International
HKT
 Speedy Group
 Hu Yi Global

International registrars 

 Instra Corporation
 Atak Domain
 Alibaba Cloud
 Foshan Yidong
 Chengdu West Dimension
 Shenzhen Internet Works
 Shanghai Meicheng
 TopNets Technology
 Bizcn.com
 Ascio Technologies
 SafeBrands
 united-domains
 1API
 InterNetX
 EuroDNS
 Web Commerce Communications (Singapore)
 Hosting Concepts
 IP Mirror
 AB Name ISP
 Net-Chinese
 Crazy Domains
 Safenames
 101 Domain
 MarkMonitor
 Marcaria.com
 CSC Corporate Domains

See also 
 .mo (ccTLD for Macau)
 .cn (Mainland China)
 Communications in Hong Kong
 Internationalized domain name
 Telecommunications industry in Hong Kong

Notes

References

External links 
 Joint University Computer Centre
 Hong Kong Domain Name Registration Company Limited
 root-zone whois information for .hk
 .HK Domain Registration and Information Service

Country code top-level domains
Internet in Hong Kong

sv:Toppdomän#H